Rhaebosterna is a genus of leaf beetles in the family Chrysomelidae found in Australia. These beetles are striped and small. The genus contains three species and was first described by Julius Weise in 1917. One species seen in Victoria is Rhaebosterna interruptofasciata was matched to a specimen in the Victorian museum. This was found on several occasions on tea tree.

References

Beetles of Australia
Chrysomelinae
Chrysomelidae genera
Taxa named by Julius Weise